Kinixys is a genus of turtles in the family Testudinidae. The genus was erected by Thomas Bell in 1827. The species in the genus Kinixys are native to Sub-Saharan Africa and Madagascar and commonly known as hinged tortoises or hinge-back tortoises.

Most of the Kinixys species are omnivores. They feed mainly on a wide range of different leaves, weeds, roots, flowers and fruits. However, they also eat worms, insects and other small invertebrates.

Species
The following species are recognised in the genus Kinixys:
Kinixys belliana  – Bell's hinge-back tortoise
Kinixys erosa  – forest hinge-back tortoise
Kinixys homeana  – Home's hinge-back tortoise 
Kinixys lobatsiana  – Lobatse hinge-back tortoise 
Kinixys natalensis  – Natal hinge-back tortoise 
Kinixys nogueyi 
Kinixys spekii  – Speke's hinge-back tortoise
Kinixys zombensis 

Nota bene: A binomial authority in parentheses indicates that the species was originally described in a genus other than Kinixys.

Distribution and habitat
The several species of the genus Kinxys are found across much of tropical and sub-tropical sub-Saharan Africa, ranging as far south as KwaZulu-Natal in South Africa, and as far north as the fringes of the Sahel and Sahara. However, individuals are often very scarce within this range, and several species are threatened.

Though the species' wide geographic ranges overlap considerably, they are separated from each other by favouring different habitats within this range. Some species (such as K. belliana) favour open savannah or grasslands, others (such as K. homeana) favour rainforest.

Parasites
Species of tortoises in the genus Kinixys play host to a number of ectoparasites (external) and endoparasites (internal). A survey (by Alan Probert & Clive Humphreys) of mixed captive K. spekii and K. belliana (mostly K. spekii) in Zimbabwe showed that the following parasites were known to infest/infect this species. This had been observed and published by others too. However some of the tiny roundworms (photographed under scanning electron microscope) are very likely new species and as yet remain undescribed.  
Ticks (Arachnida)  
Roundworms (Nematoda) – Angusticium, Atractis and Tachygontria

References

Further reading

Bell, T. (1827). "On two new Genera of Land Tortoises". The Transactions of the Linnean Society of London. 15: 392–401. (Kinixys, new genus, p. 398). (in English and Latin).

 
Turtle genera
Turtles of Africa
Reptiles of Sub-Saharan Africa
Taxa named by Thomas Bell (zoologist)
Taxonomy articles created by Polbot